Jugglers is a 2017 South Korean television series starring Baek Jin-hee, Choi Daniel, Kang Hye-jung and Lee Won-keun. It aired from December 4, 2017 to January 23, 2018 on KBS2's Mondays and Tuesdays at 22:00 (KST) time slot for 16 episodes.

Synopsis
A secretary with a passive and obedient personality meets a boss who is completely uninterested in others and has no consideration for them.

Cast

Main
 Baek Jin-hee as Jwa Yoon-yi (29 years old), Chi-won's secretary who is skilled in assisting and supporting her superiors. She is quick to adapt and knows how to get by in any situation.
 Choi Daniel as Nam Chi-won (36 years old), the director of a media company who is completely uninterested in others and has no consideration for them, but somehow always ends up getting attention from women.
 Kang Hye-jung as Wang Jeong-ae (37 years old), a mother who returns to the workforce after fifteen years as a full-time housewife.
 Lee Won-keun as Hwangbo Yul (28 years old), the director of sports business department who was born with a silver spoon in his mouth.

Supporting
 Cha Joo-young as Ma Bo-na (29 years old)
 Jung Hye-in as Park Kyung-rye (29 years old)
 In Gyo-jin as Managing Director Jo Sang-moo (44 years old)
 In Gyo-jin as himself (Cameo appearance, ep. 16)
 Kim Chang-wan as Vice President Do Tae-geun (61 years old)
 Moon Ji-hoo as Min Deul-re

Video division
 Jung Sung-ho as Director Gong Yoo (42 years old)
 Jung Soo-young as Moon Soon-yeong (34 years old)
 Kim Ki-bang as Park Chi-soo (33 years old)
 Song Ji-ho as Go Myung-suk (28 years old)

Sports division
 Cha Soon-bae as General Manager Baek Soon-bae (45 years old)
 Park Kyung-hye as Goo Kye-young (30 years old)
 Shin Min-kyung as Go Si-won (26 years old)
 Kim Se-rin as Joo Pan-mi (22 years old)

People around Yoon-yi
 Min Jin-woong as Woo Chang-soo (32 years old), Yoon-yi's ex-boyfriend.
 Hong Kyung as Jwa Tae-yi (21 years old), Yoon-yi's younger brother.
 Lee Ji-ha as Kang Soon-deok (54 years old), Yoon-yi's mother.

Extended
 Choi Dae-chul as Director Bong Jang-woo
 Jung Joon-won as Park Gun-woo, Jeong-ae's son
 Cha Joo-young as Ma Bo-na	
 Kim Soo-yeon as Wang Mi-ae, Jeong-ae's younger sister
 Seo Eun-woo as Do Do-hee, Chi-won's ex-wife and Do Tae-geun's daughter
 Jeon Joon-ho as Park Joon-pyo, Jeong-ae's husband

Cameo appearances
 Sung Hoon as Kyung-jun, Yoon-yi's ex-boyfriend.
 Hwang Seung-eon as Secretary Kang
 Alberto Mondi as Henry
 Jung Young-joo as Bong's wife
 Choi Yeo-jin as CEO's secretary
 Yoo Ji-tae as Choi Kang-woo

Original soundtrack

Part 1

Part 2

Part 3

Part 4

Part 5

Part 6

Part 7

Part 8

Production
 The male lead role was first offered to Yoon Kyun-sang, but declined.
 The series marks Choi Daniel's first acting project after his military service, as well as Kang Hye-jung's first TV series in five years.
 The first script reading of the cast was held at a resort in Incheon which took two days and one night.

Ratings

Awards and nominations

References

External links
  
 
 
 

Korean Broadcasting System television dramas
Korean-language television shows
2017 South Korean television series debuts
2018 South Korean television series endings
South Korean romantic comedy television series
South Korean workplace television series
Television series by Story TV